Haplostigma is a genus of arborescent lycopodiopsid, found only in the early part of the Middle Devonian.

References

Prehistoric lycophyte genera
Devonian plants